Ten Laps to Go (King of the Speedway) is a 1938 American action/drama film directed by Elmer Clifton. The film stars Rex Lease as a champion race car driver, Duncan Renaldo as his rival, and Muriel Evans as the romantic interest. Former silent film star Marie Prevost has a small role in this film, which would prove to be her last; her death from self-inflicted malnutrition and alcoholism occurred less than six months later.

Production notes
Ten Laps to Go was produced by the independent company Fanchon Royer Pictures and was distributed theatrically under the states-rights system. It has been released on television in the US under the title King of the Speedway.

DVD release
Ten Laps to Go is available under its original title from budget DVD companies; it is available from Alpha Video on a double-bill with Go-Get-'Em, Haines.

References

External links

1938 films
1930s independent films
American action drama films
American independent films
American auto racing films
American black-and-white films
1930s English-language films
Films directed by Elmer Clifton
1930s action drama films
1938 drama films
1930s American films